A Current Affair may refer to:

 A Current Affair (Australian TV program), 1971–present Australian current affairs program that airs on Nine Network
 A Current Affair (American TV program), a 1986–1998 American television newsmagazine program that aired in syndication, and was revived in 2005

See also
 Current affairs (disambiguation)